Ogcodes gibbosus  is a Palearctic species of fly in the family Acroceridae.

References

External links
NHM

Acroceridae
Flies described in 1758
Taxa named by Carl Linnaeus
Asilomorph flies of Europe